Thomas Kirkpatrick was an American politician from New York.

Life
He lived in Albany, New York, and was an alderman, elected in the Tenth Ward in 1843, and Overseer of the Poor.

In 1853, he was elected, on the Whig ticket, Inspector of State Prisons, and was in office from 1854 to 1856.

He was Warden of Auburn State Prison from January 1860 to January 1864.

In 1871, he was again elected State Prison Inspector, this time on the Republican ticket. He was in office from 1872 to 1874, but was defeated for re-election in 1874.

Sources
 
 
 

Year of birth missing
Year of death missing
Politicians from Albany, New York
New York State Prison Inspectors
American prison wardens
Politicians from Auburn, New York
New York (state) Whigs
19th-century American politicians
New York (state) Republicans